The Office of Public Engagement (OPE) at the United States Department of Labor is an office under the direction of the Secretary of Labor. It works to advance the secretary's mission by making the department inclusive, transparent, accountable and responsible. The office coordinates the outreach efforts of individual agencies within the department to ensure a broad cross-section of stakeholder participation in all facets of the department's efforts. The office works with the Office of Intergovernmental Affairs and the Center for Faith-Based and Neighborhood Partnerships to form the secretary's outreach team.

References

External links
 OPE Home Page

Public